Bangladesh–Philippines relations refer to the bilateral relations between Bangladesh and Philippines.

History
Relations between the Philippines and Bangladesh predate the modern establishment of these nations. Seafarers in the Bay of Bengal where modern Bangladesh is now located in, have been sailing and trading with Southeast Asia (The Philippines included) since the early Christian era. In the 900s the Gupta Empire which had territory in Bangladesh spread South Asian culture to Southeast Asia (Including the Philippines) via trade. It may be in this era when Bangladesh, Srivijaya and South India was under the same Chola dynasty was also when the half Malay and half Tamil Cholan prince Sri Lumay, founded the Rajahnate of Cebu. Later, in the midst of the Spanish colonial times, Bangladesh and South India have been a leading source of slave labour for the Philippines during majority of the era.

The Philippines as an independent nation, recognized Bangladesh on 24 February 1972, and establish diplomatic ties. It was one of the first countries to recognise Bangladesh after its Independence in 1971. Bangladesh opened an embassy in the Philippines in 1981. Prime Minister Ataur Rahman Khan visited the Philippines in 1985. Prime Minister Sheikh Hasina visited in September 1997. Bangladesh has a resident embassy in the Philippines and the Philippines has a resident ambassador in Bangladesh.

Economic relations
Bangladesh imported goods worth  US$78.22 million and imported goods from the Philippines worth  19.32 million 2013-2014 fiscal year. Bangladesh is the third largest trading partner of the Philippines in South Asia. On February 2016, US$81 million was stolen from Bangladesh Bank and was laundered through a bank in the Philippines. The Philippines has repatriated 15 million dollar of the stolen money.

References

External links
 Embassy of Bangladesh in the Philippines
 Embassy of the Philippines in Bangladesh

 
Philippines
Bangladesh